Litobothrium amsichensis is a species of tapeworms from the family Litobothriidae.

This species was first described (along with Marsupiobothrium gobelinus) from a specimen collected from the spiral valve digestive organ of a goblin shark (Mitsukurina owstoni) caught in New South Wales in Australia.

References 

Cestoda
Animals described in 1993
Parasitic helminths of fish